The northern alligator lizard (Elgaria coerulea) is a species of medium-sized lizard in the family Anguidae. The species is endemic to the North American west coast.

Taxonomy
The northern alligator lizard was formerly known by the scientific name of Gerrhonotus coeruleus , but more recently has been assigned to the genus Elgaria.

Subspecies
Four subspecies are recognized as being valid, including the nominotypical subspecies.
E. c. coerulea  – San Francisco alligator lizard
E. c. palmeri  – Sierra alligator lizard
E. c. principis  – Northwestern alligator lizard
E. c. shastensis  – Shasta alligator lizard

A trinomial authority in parentheses indicates that the subspecies was originally described in a genus other than Elgaria.

The subspecies E. c. principis is one of five species of lizards in Canada.

Etymology
The subspecific name, palmeri, is in honor of American zoologist Theodore Sherman Palmer.

Description
The northern alligator lizard is a medium-sized slender lizard. It has a distinct skin fold on each side, separating the keeled scales on the back from the smooth ventral scales. The skin varies in color, but can be brown and white or greenish yellow and brown. Dorsally, E. coerulea is brownish in color and often has dark blotches that sometimes blend together into bands. The throat and mouth area of some young individuals can be yellow. The belly is light gray. The eyes are dark.

Diet
The typical diet of E. coerulea includes crickets, slugs, beetles, spiders, and moths, but it will also take larger prey, such as small lizards, and will even eat small baby mice if given the opportunity.

Reproduction
The northern alligator lizard is live-bearing, producing up to 15 young (typically 4–5), between June and September. During the spring breeding season, a male lizard grasps the head of a female with his mouth until she is ready to let him mate with her. They can remain attached this way for many hours, almost oblivious to their surroundings. Besides keeping her from running off to mate with another male, this probably shows her how strong and suitable a mate he is.

Distribution

The northern alligator lizard occurs along the Pacific Coast and in the Rocky Mountains from southern British Columbia through Washington, northern Idaho and western Montana south through Oregon to the coastal range and the Sierra Nevada in central California. As the map shows, the different subspecies have quite different geographic ranges, with E. c. principis being the most widely distributed, whereas E. c. coerulea occurs mainly around the San Francisco area but is also found farther north into Humboldt County.

It is found in a variety of forested habitats and montane chaparral.

As winter sets in, colder temperatures force northern alligator lizards to undergo brumation. Brumation allows them to reduce caloric usage and retain body heat during winter. Often, western alligator lizards choose to hide under rocks—though logs and burrows are occasionally used—to undergo this process.

See also
 Southern alligator lizard

References

Further reading
Boulenger GA (1885). Catalogue of the Lizards in the British Museum (Natural History). Second Edition. Volume II. ... Anguidæ ... London: Trustees of the British Museum (Natural History). (Taylor and Francis, printers). xiii + 497 pp. + Plates I-XXIV. (Gerrhonotus cæruleus, pp. 273–274).
Wiegmann AF (1828). "Beiträge zur Amphibienkunde ". Isis von Oken 21 (4): 364-383. (Gerrhonotus coeruleus, new species, p. 380). (in German and Latin).

External links

 Images from Californiaherps.com
 Description and range map from the California Department of Fish and Game.
 Taxonomical Information
 Description, photos, and information from the British Columbia Ministry of Environment

Elgaria
Fauna of the California chaparral and woodlands
Fauna of the San Francisco Bay Area
Fauna of the Sierra Nevada (United States)
Reptiles of Canada
Reptiles of the United States
Reptiles described in 1828
Taxa named by Arend Friedrich August Wiegmann